Grape Creek High School is a 3A high school operated by the Grape Creek Independent School District in north central Tom Green County, Texas (USA). It serves the community of Grape Creek, San Angelo, and surrounding rural areas.   In 2011, the school was rated "Academically Acceptable" by the Texas Education Agency.

Athletics
The Grape Creek Eagles compete in the following sports: Cross Country, Volleyball, Football, Basketball, Powerlifting, Tennis, Track, Softball & Baseball.

References

External links
Grape Creek ISD

Schools in Tom Green County, Texas
Public high schools in Texas